Arkansas City USD 470 is a public unified school district headquartered in Arkansas City, Kansas, United States.  The district includes the communities of Arkansas City, Parkerfield, Silverdale, and nearby rural areas.

History
The public school system developed beginning in 1872. The district, throughout its history, did not do racial segregation. The first class of high school students graduated in 1880.

Schools
The school district operates the following schools:

Secondary: 
 Arkansas City High School
 See also: Old Arkansas City High School
 Arkansas City Middle School
 The first junior high school, built south of an existing vocational training school, was 16-classroom facility with a cost of $100,000. It finished construction in Spring 1918 and had its dedication that May 16. In addition to classrooms and offices, it included an auditorium, a gymnasium, a library, and science laboratories.

Primary:
 Adams Elementary School
 C-4 Elementary School
 IXL Elementary School
 Jefferson Elementary School
 Roosevelt Elementary School
 It originated as the First Ward School, which began using a brick building in that ward in 1874. It originally housed all grade levels but later became only an elementary school. In 1888 it received an expansion.
 Frances Willard Elementary School
 It originated in 1885 as the Fourth Ward School and also was known as the Central School. Two classrooms, each in one of two  wings, were added to the building in 1924 along with plumbing and heating services and more windows to improve lighting; the construction done by the Wichita company W. H. Underhill, who hired forty workers for the purpose.

Former schools:
 Washington Elementary School
 It opened in 1887 as Third Ward Elementary School, in a brick and limestone building, equipped with steam heating, on a former hunting grounds. The Grand Rapids, Michigan firm Grand Rapids School and Furniture Company created the furniture used in the school. When the original building was affected by flooding, the school moved to another facility.
 The district's board approved the construction of a vocational/manual training school in 1910, and that facility, which had air circulation systems, was remodeled in 1917.

See also
 Kansas State Department of Education
 Kansas State High School Activities Association
 List of high schools in Kansas
 List of unified school districts in Kansas

References

External links
 

School districts in Kansas
Education in Cowley County, Kansas
School districts established in 1872
1872 establishments in Kansas